The Finnish motorcycle Grand Prix was part of the FIM Grand Prix motorcycle racing championship from 1962 to 1982. It was held at the Tampere Circuit in 1962 and 1963 before moving to the Imatra Circuit. Giacomo Agostini won the most Finnish Grands Prix with ten 500cc victories and seven 350cc victories. In July 2016, it was announced the Grand Prix would return on the new Kymi Ring circuit.

After a 5-year contract was agreed, to start with a scheduled event in 2021, this was cancelled on 14 May 2021 due to COVID-19. The next anticipated event for 2022 was cancelled on 25 May 2022, due to incomplete homologation works at the track and the risks associated with the geopolitical situation in the region concerning the 2022 Russian invasion of Ukraine. The MotoGP 2023 provisional race calendar was announced in late September 2022, without the Finnish Grand Prix.

Official names and sponsors
1964, 1968, 1972–1974: Suomen Grand Prix (no official sponsor)
1969: Suomen/Finnish Grand Prix (no official sponsor)
1975–1976, 1978–1979: Imatranajo (no official sponsor)
1977: Suomen Grand Prix/Finnish Grand Prix (no official sponsor)
1980–1982: Finnish GP (no official sponsor)

Formerly used circuits

Winners of the Finnish Grand Prix

Multiple winners (riders)

Multiple winners (manufacturers)

By year

References

 
Motorsport competitions in Finland
Recurring sporting events established in 1962
1962 establishments in Finland